Tajmuraz Salkazanov (born 6 April 1996) is a Slovak naturalized freestyle wrestler of Russian origins and Ossetian ethnicity who competes at 74 kilograms. Representing Slovakia since 2018, Salkazanov became the 2021 European Champion when he defeated two–time World Champion Frank Chamizo and 2020 Individual World Cup champion Razambek Zhamalov back to back. Prior, he claimed bronze medals from the 2019 World Championships at 79 kg and from the 2020 Individual World Cup at 74 kg and was also the 2018 U23 World Champion at 70 kg.  In April of 2022, Salkazanov became a two-time European champion, defeating Chamizo in the final by the score 7-5.

Career 

In 2018, he won the gold medal in the men's 70 kg event at the 2018 U23 World Wrestling Championships held in Bucharest, Romania. In 2019, he won a bronze medal in the men's 79 kg event at the World Wrestling Championships held in Nur-Sultan, Kazakhstan. In 2020, he won one of the bronze medals in the 74 kg event at the Individual Wrestling World Cup held in Belgrade, Serbia.

In March 2021, he competed at the European Qualification Tournament in Budapest, Hungary hoping to qualify for the 2020 Summer Olympics in Tokyo, Japan. He did not qualify at this tournament and he also failed to qualify for the Olympics at the World Olympic Qualification Tournament held in Sofia, Bulgaria.

In April 2021, he claimed the 2021 European Championship.

In 2022, he won the gold medal in his event at the Matteo Pellicone Ranking Series 2022 held in Rome, Italy. He won the silver medal in the men's 74kg event at the 2022 World Wrestling Championships held in Belgrade, Serbia.

Achievements

Freestyle record 

! colspan="7"| Senior Freestyle Matches
|-
!  Res.
!  Record
!  Opponent
!  Score
!  Date
!  Event
!  Location
|-
! style=background:white colspan=7 |
|-
|Win
|44–13
|align=left| Frank Chamizo
|style="font-size:88%"|7-5
|style="font-size:88%"|March 30, 2022
|style="font-size:88%" rowspan=4|2022 European Championships
|style="text-align:left;font-size:88%;" rowspan=4| Budapest, Hungary
|-
|Win
|43–13
|align=left| Turan Bayramov
|style="font-size:88%"|8-2
|style="font-size:88%"|March 29, 2022
|-
|Win
|42–13
|align=left| Zurab Kapraev
|style="font-size:88%"|12-1
|style="font-size:88%"|March 29, 2022
|-
|Win
|41–13
|align=left| Kamil Rybicki
|style="font-size:88%"|5–0
|style="font-size:88%"|March 29, 2022
|-
! style=background:white colspan=7 |
|-
|Loss
|40–13
|align=left| Kyle Dake
|style="font-size:88%"|3–7
|style="font-size:88%"|October 3, 2021
|style="font-size:88%" rowspan=4|2021 World Championships
|style="text-align:left;font-size:88%;" rowspan=4| Oslo, Norway
|-
|Win
|40–12
|align=left| Avtandil Kentchadze
|style="font-size:88%"|5–0
|style="font-size:88%" rowspan=3|October 2, 2021
|-
|Win
|39–12
|align=left| Timur Bizhoev
|style="font-size:88%"|2–2
|-
|Win
|38–12
|align=left| Ali-Pasha Umarpashaev
|style="font-size:88%"|3–0
|-
! style=background:white colspan=7 |
|-
|Win
|37–12
|align=left| Vitali Ihnatovich
|style="font-size:88%"|TF 10–0
|style="font-size:88%" rowspan=3|September 10–12, 2021
|style="font-size:88%" rowspan=3|2021 Alexander Medved Prizes
|style="text-align:left;font-size:88%;" rowspan=3|
 Minsk, Belarus
|-
|Loss
|36–12
|align=left| Magoma Dibirgadzhiev
|style="font-size:88%"|6–8
|-
|Win
|36–11
|align=left| Timur Nikolaev
|style="font-size:88%"|3–0
|-
! style=background:white colspan=7 | 
|-
|Win
|35–11
|align=left| Arsalan Budazhapov
|style="font-size:88%"|5–2
|style="font-size:88%" rowspan=5|May 6–7, 2021
|style="font-size:88%" rowspan=5|2021 World Olympic Qualification Tournament
|style="text-align:left;font-size:88%;" rowspan=5|
 Sofia, Bulgaria
|-
|Loss
|34–11
|align=left| Magomedkhabib Kadimagomedov
|style="font-size:88%"|2–13
|-
|Win
|34–10
|align=left| Ali-Pasha Umarpashaev 
|style="font-size:88%"|6–4
|-
|Win
|33–10
|align=left| Zurab Kapraev
|style="font-size:88%"|TF 10–0
|-
|Win
|32–10
|align=left| Marc Dietsche
|style="font-size:88%"|TF 12–2
|-
! style=background:white colspan=7 |
|-
|Win
|31–10
|align=left| Miroslav Kirov
|style="font-size:88%"|TF 10–0
|style="font-size:88%" rowspan=5|April 20–21, 2021
|style="font-size:88%" rowspan=5|2021 European Continental Championships
|style="text-align:left;font-size:88%;" rowspan=5|
 Warsaw, Poland
|-
|Win
|30–10
|align=left| Razambek Zhamalov
|style="font-size:88%"|6–5
|-
|Win
|29–10
|align=left| Avtandil Kentchadze
|style="font-size:88%"|6–5
|-
|Win
|28–10
|align=left| Frank Chamizo 
|style="font-size:88%"|6–2
|-
|Win
|27–10
|align=left| Daniel Sartakov
|style="font-size:88%"|4–0
|-
! style=background:white colspan=7 |
|-
|Loss
|26–10
|align=left| Ali-Pasha Umarpashaev
|style="font-size:88%"|Fall
|style="font-size:88%" rowspan=2|March 18, 2021
|style="font-size:88%" rowspan=2|2021 European Olympic Qualification Tournament
|style="text-align:left;font-size:88%;" rowspan=2|
 Budapest, Hungary
|-
|Win
|26–9
|align=left| Erik Reinbok
|style="font-size:88%"|8–1
|-
! style=background:white colspan=7 |
|-
|Win
|25–9
|align=left| Murad Kuramagomedov
|style="font-size:88%"|2–2
|style="font-size:88%" rowspan=4|December 12–18, 2020
|style="font-size:88%" rowspan=4|2020 Individual World Cup
|style="text-align:left;font-size:88%;" rowspan=4|
 Belgrade, Serbia
|-
|Loss
|24–9
|align=left| Razambek Zhamalov
|style="font-size:88%"|0–5
|-
|Win
|24–8
|align=left| Maxim Vasilioglo
|style="font-size:88%"|TF 10–0
|-
|Win
|23–8
|align=left| Denys Pavlov
|style="font-size:88%"|7–0
|-
! style=background:white colspan=7 |
|-
|Win
|22–8
|align=left| Galymzhan Usserbayev
|style="font-size:88%"|3–2
|style="font-size:88%" rowspan=5|September 21–22, 2019
|style="font-size:88%" rowspan=5|2019 World Championships
|style="text-align:left;font-size:88%;" rowspan=5|
 Nur-Sultan, Kazakhstan
|-
|Loss
|21–8
|align=left| Jabrayil Hasanov
|style="font-size:88%"|3–4
|-
|Win
|21–7
|align=left| Jitender Kumar
|style="font-size:88%"|4–0
|-
|Win
|20–7
|align=left| Dorjvaanchigiin Gombodorj 
|style="font-size:88%"|2–1
|-
|Win
|19–7
|align=left| Ayoub Barraj
|style="font-size:88%"|7–1
|-
! style=background:white colspan=7 |
|-
|Win
|18–7
|align=left| Yakup Gör
|style="font-size:88%"|7–5
|style="font-size:88%" rowspan=4|July 11–14, 2019
|style="font-size:88%" rowspan=4|2019 Yasar Dogu International
|style="text-align:left;font-size:88%;" rowspan=4|
 Istanbul, Turkey
|-
|Win
|17–7
|align=left| Csaba Vida
|style="font-size:88%"|TF 12–2
|-
|Loss
|16–7
|align=left| Jordan Burroughs
|style="font-size:88%"|4–6
|-
|Win
|16–6
|align=left| Azat Sakayev
|style="font-size:88%"|TF 10–0
|-
! style=background:white colspan=7 |
|-
|Win
|15–6
|align=left| David Baev
|style="font-size:88%"|9–1
|style="font-size:88%" rowspan=4|November 12–18, 2018
|style="font-size:88%" rowspan=4|2018 U23 World Championships
|style="text-align:left;font-size:88%;" rowspan=4|
 Bucharest, Romania
|-
|Win
|14–6
|align=left| Oleksii Boruta
|style="font-size:88%"|9–0
|-
|Win
|13–6
|align=left| Jintaro Motoyama
|style="font-size:88%"|TF 10–0
|-
|Win
|12–6
|align=left| Naveen
|style="font-size:88%"|TF 10–0
|-
! style=background:white colspan=7 |
|-
|Loss
|11–6
|align=left| Zurabi Iakobishvili
|style="font-size:88%"|1–2
|style="font-size:88%" rowspan=2|October 22, 2018
|style="font-size:88%" rowspan=2|2018 World Championships
|style="text-align:left;font-size:88%;" rowspan=2|
 Budapest, Hungary
|-
|Win
|11–5
|align=left| Younes Emami
|style="font-size:88%"|7–7
|-
! style=background:white colspan=7 |
|-
|Win
|10–5
|align=left| Konstantin Khabalashvili
|style="font-size:88%"|4–0
|style="font-size:88%" rowspan=4|July 3–5, 2018
|style="font-size:88%" rowspan=4|2018 Tbilisi Grand Prix
|style="text-align:left;font-size:88%;" rowspan=4|
 Tbilisi, Georgia
|-
|Loss
|9–5
|align=left| Zurabi Iakobishvili
|style="font-size:88%"|3–7
|-
|Win
|9–4
|align=left| Giorgi Sulava
|style="font-size:88%"|TF 11–0
|-
|Win
|8–4
|align=left| Aidyn Tazhigali
|style="font-size:88%"|TF 14–4
|-
! style=background:white colspan=7 |
|-
|Loss
|7–4
|align=left| Giorgi Sulava
|style="font-size:88%"|2–2
|style="font-size:88%" |June 8, 2018
|style="font-size:88%" |2018 U23 European Continental Championships
|style="text-align:left;font-size:88%;" |
 Istanbul, Turkey
|-
! style=background:white colspan=7 |
|-
|Win
|7–3
|align=left| Ramazan Ramazanov
|style="font-size:88%"|TF 10–0
|style="font-size:88%" rowspan=4|May 14–18, 2018
|style="font-size:88%" rowspan=4|2018 Ali Aliev Memorial
|style="text-align:left;font-size:88%;" rowspan=4|
 Kaspiysk, Dagestan
|-
|Loss
|6–3
|align=left| Khadzhimurad Gadzhiyev
|style="font-size:88%"|5–6
|-
|Win
|6–2
|align=left| Ildus Giniyatullin
|style="font-size:88%"|5–2
|-
|Win
|5–2
|align=left| Mansur Syrgak Uulu
|style="font-size:88%"|8–0
|-
! style=background:white colspan=7 |
|-
|Loss
|4–2
|align=left| Zurabi Iakobishvili
|style="font-size:88%"|2–6
|style="font-size:88%" rowspan=2|May 4, 2018
|style="font-size:88%" rowspan=2|2018 European Continental Championships
|style="text-align:left;font-size:88%;" rowspan=2|
 Kaspiysk, Dagestan
|-
|Win
|4–1
|align=left| George Bucur
|style="font-size:88%"|Fall
|-
! style=background:white colspan=7 |
|-
|Win
|3–1
|align=left| Enes Uslu
|style="font-size:88%"|4–1
|style="font-size:88%" rowspan=4|March 22–25, 2018
|style="font-size:88%" rowspan=4|2018 Dan Kolov - Nikola Petrov
|style="text-align:left;font-size:88%;" rowspan=4|
 Sofia, Bulgaria
|-
|Loss
|2–1
|align=left| Ilyas Bekbulatov
|style="font-size:88%"|
|-
|Win
|2–0
|align=left| George Bucur
|style="font-size:88%"|
|-
|Win
|1–0
|align=left| Giorgi Sulava
|style="font-size:88%"|
|-

References

External links 
 

Living people
1996 births
People from North Ossetia–Alania
Slovak male sport wrestlers
World Wrestling Championships medalists
European Wrestling Champions